George Segal Jr. (February 13, 1934 – March 23, 2021) was an American actor. He became popular in the 1960s and 1970s for playing both dramatic and comedic roles. After first rising to prominence with roles in acclaimed films such as Ship of Fools (1965) and King Rat (1965), he co-starred in the classic drama Who's Afraid of Virginia Woolf? (1966).

Through the next decade and a half, Segal consistently starred in notable films across a variety of genres including The Quiller Memorandum (1966), The St. Valentine's Day Massacre (1967), No Way to Treat a Lady (1968), Where's Poppa? (1970), The Owl and the Pussycat (1970), The Hot Rock (1972), Blume in Love (1973), A Touch of Class (1973), California Split (1974), The Duchess and the Dirtwater Fox (1976), Fun with Dick and Jane (1977), Who Is Killing the Great Chefs of Europe? (1978) and The Last Married Couple in America (1980). He was one of the first American film actors to rise to leading man status with an unchanged Jewish surname, helping pave the way for other major actors of his generation. Later in his career, he appeared in supporting roles in films such as Stick (1985), Look Who's Talking (1989), For the Boys (1991), The Mirror Has Two Faces (1996), Flirting with Disaster (1996), 2012 (2009) and Love & Other Drugs (2010).

He was nominated for the Academy Award for Best Supporting Actor for his performance in Who's Afraid of Virginia Woolf? and won two Golden Globe Awards, including the Golden Globe Award for Best Actor in a Motion Picture Musical or Comedy for his performance in A Touch of Class.

On television, he was best known for his regular roles in two popular sitcoms, playing Jack Gallo on Just Shoot Me! (1997–2003) and Albert "Pops" Solomon on The Goldbergs (2013–2021).

Segal was also an accomplished banjo player. He released three albums and performed with the instrument in several of his acting roles and on late-night television.

Early life 
George Segal Jr. was born in New York City, the youngest of four children to Fannie Blanche Segal (née Bodkin) and George Segal Sr., a malt and hop agent. He spent much of his childhood in Great Neck, New York. All four of Segal's grandparents were Russian-Jewish immigrants, and his maternal grandparents changed their surname from Slobodkin to Bodkin. A paternal great-grandfather ran for governor of Massachusetts as a socialist. His oldest brother, John, worked in the hops brokerage business and was an innovator in the cultivation of new hop varieties; the middle brother, Fred, was a screenwriter; and his sister Greta died of pneumonia before he was born.

Segal's family was Jewish, but he was raised in a secular household.  When asked if he had had a bar mitzvah, Segal stated:
I'm afraid not. I went to a Passover Seder at Groucho Marx's once and he kept saying, "When do we get to the wine?" So that's my [Jewish] experience. I went to [a friend's] bar mitzvah, and that was the only time I was in Temple Beth Shalom. [Jewish life] wasn't happening that much at the time. People's car tires were slashed in front of the temple. I was once kicked down a flight of stairs by some kids from [the local parochial school].

Segal became interested in acting at the age of nine, when he saw Alan Ladd in This Gun for Hire. "I knew the revolver and the trench coat were an illusion and I didn't care," said Segal. "I liked the sense of adventure and control." He also started playing the banjo at a young age, later stating: "I started off with the ukulele when I was a kid in Great Neck. A friend had a red Harold Teen model; it won my heart. When I got to high school, I realized you couldn't play in a band with a ukulele, so I moved on to the four-string banjo."

When his father died in 1947, Segal moved to New York City with his mother. He graduated from George School, a Quaker boarding school in Pennsylvania, in 1951 and attended Haverford College. He graduated from Columbia College of Columbia University in 1955 with a Bachelor of Arts in performing arts and drama. He played banjo at Haverford and also at Columbia, where he played with a dixieland jazz band that had several different names. When he booked a gig, he would bill the group as Bruno Lynch and his Imperial Jazz Band. The group, which later settled on the name Red Onion Jazz Band,  played at Segal's first wedding.

Segal served in the United States Army during the Korean War. While there, he played in a band called Corporal Bruno's Sad Sack Six.

Career

Early roles and success 
After college and the army, Segal eventually studied at the Actors Studio with Lee Strasberg and Uta Hagen and got a job as an understudy in the 1956 off-Broadway production of The Iceman Cometh starring Jason Robards.  He appeared in Antony and Cleopatra for Joseph Papp and joined an improvisational group called The Premise, which performed at a Bleecker Street coffeehouse and whose ranks included Buck Henry and Theodore J. Flicker. Segal continued to perform on Broadway with roles in Gideon (1961–62) by Paddy Chayefsky, which ran for 236 performances, as well as Rattle of a Simple Man (1963), an adaptation of a British hit, with Tammy Grimes and Edward Woodward.

He was signed to a Columbia Pictures contract in 1961, making his film debut in The Young Doctors. Segal made several television appearances in the early 1960s, including Alfred Hitchcock Presents, Armstrong Circle Theatre, and Naked City, and appeared in the well-known World War II film The Longest Day (1962). He also had a small role in Act One (1963) and a more prominent part in the western Invitation to a Gunfighter (1964) alongside Yul Brynner.

Segal came to Hollywood from New York City to star in a TV series with Robert Taylor that never aired. Nonetheless, he joined the cast of Columbia Pictures' medical drama The New Interns (1964), and the studio then put him under long-term contract. The role ultimately earned him the Golden Globe Award for New Star of the Year, alongside Harve Presnell and Chaim Topol.

Critical acclaim 
In 1965, Segal played an egocentric painter in an ensemble cast led by Vivien Leigh and Lee Marvin in Stanley Kramer's acclaimed drama Ship of Fools, which was nominated for the Academy Award for Best Picture. The same year, he also played the title role as a scheming P.O.W. in the well-regarded war drama King Rat (a role originally meant for Frank Sinatra) and received acclaim for both performances.  In other notable film appearances, he played the titular role of a secret service agent on assignment in Berlin in The Quiller Memorandum (1966), an Algerian paratrooper who becomes a leader of the FLN in Lost Command (1966), and a Cagney-esque gangster in Roger Corman's The St. Valentine's Day Massacre (1967).

Segal also appeared in several prominent television films, playing Biff in an acclaimed production of Death of a Salesman (1966) next to Lee J. Cobb, a gangster in an adaptation of The Desperate Hours (1967), and George in an adaptation  of Of Mice and Men (1968). The latter two films were both directed by Ted Kotcheff, with whom he worked again several times.

Segal was loaned to Warner Bros. for Mike Nichols' directorial debut Who's Afraid of Virginia Woolf? (1966), a now-classic adaptation of the Edward Albee play. Nichols had previously directed Segal in a 1964 Off-Broadway play titled The Knack and cast him again in Woolf after Robert Redford had turned down the role. In the four-person ensemble piece, Segal played the young faculty member, Nick, alongside Elizabeth Taylor, Richard Burton, and Sandy Dennis. The film, which received an Academy Award nomination for Best Picture and was later selected to the National Film Registry, is arguably Segal's best known and, for his role, he was nominated for an Oscar and a Golden Globe.

The same year, Segal released his debut LP, The Yama Yama Man. The title track is a ragtime version of the 1908 tune "The Yama Yama Man" with horns and banjos. Segal released the album at a time when he appeared regularly playing banjo on The Tonight Show Starring Johnny Carson. In the same year, Segal played banjo and sang with The Smothers Brothers when they performed Phil Ochs's "Draft Dodger Rag" on their CBS television show.

Leading man 
For over ten years after his success with Woolf, Segal received many notable film roles, often working with major filmmakers and becoming a significant figure in the New Hollywood movement. He starred in Carl Reiner's celebrated dark comedy Where's Poppa? (1970), played the lead role in Sidney Lumet's Bye Bye Braverman (1968), starred with Robert Redford in Peter Yates's diamond heist comedy The Hot Rock (1972), starred as the titular midlife crisis victim in Paul Mazursky's acclaimed romantic comedy Blume in Love (1973), and starred alongside Elliott Gould as a gambling addict in Robert Altman's classic California Split (1974), considered by some to be the greatest gambling film of all time.

In one of his most successful roles, Segal played a philandering husband in Melvin Frank's continental romantic comedy A Touch of Class (1973) opposite Glenda Jackson. The film was nominated for the Academy Award for Best Picture, Jackson won an Oscar for her performance, and Segal won the Golden Globe Award for Best Actor – Motion Picture Musical or Comedy, which was the second Golden Globe of his career.

During this time, he had many other leading roles in various genres. He played a perplexed police detective in No Way to Treat a Lady (1968), a war-weary platoon commander in The Bridge at Remagen (1969), a man laying waste to his marriage in Loving (1970), and a hairdresser-turned-junkie in Born to Win (1971). The Owl and the Pussycat (1970), a romantic comedy starring Segal and Barbra Streisand and written by his former improv teammate Buck Henry, was particularly popular; and though Segal played against type as a dangerous computer scientist in The Terminal Man (1974), he used his popular appeal as a card shark in The Duchess and the Dirtwater Fox (1976), as a suburbanite-turned-bank robber in Fun with Dick and Jane (1977), as a heroic ride inspector in Rollercoaster (1977), and as a wealthy serial restaurant entrepreneur in Who Is Killing the Great Chefs of Europe? (1978). Other films starring Segal from this time include The Girl Who Couldn't Say No (1968), Russian Roulette (1975), and The Black Bird (1975).

During the 1970s and 1980s, Segal appeared frequently on The Tonight Show Starring Johnny Carson both as a guest and occasionally as a guest host. His appearances were marked by eccentric banter with Johnny Carson and were usually punctuated by bursts of banjo playing. In addition to playing banjo while appearing on The Tonight Show, Segal played the instrument in several of his acting roles and sang in others, such as Blume in Love.

Segal continued his music career during this time as well. In 1974, Segal's band, The Imperial Jazz Band, released an album called A Touch of Ragtime, in which Segal played the banjo. He made frequent television appearances with the "Beverly Hills Unlisted Jazz Band", whose members included actor Conrad Janis on trombone, and in 1981 they performed live at Carnegie Hall.

In 1976, Segal co-hosted the Academy Awards along with Gene Kelly, Goldie Hawn, Walter Matthau, and Robert Shaw.

Mid-career difficulties 
Segal reunited with his Touch of Class co-star Jackson and director Frank in another European-set romantic comedy, Lost and Found (1979), but the film was not a success. Neither was The Last Married Couple in America (1980) with Natalie Wood. Segal famously pulled out of the lead role in Blake Edwards' hit comedy 10 (1979), resulting in his being replaced by Dudley Moore and sued by Edwards.

With a few exceptions, in films such as Denzel Washington's film debut Carbon Copy (1981), Burt Reynolds's crime drama Stick (1985), and the popular family comedy Look Who's Talking (1989), Segal received fewer prominent roles in the 1980s. Instead, he began to star more frequently in television films, such as The Deadly Game (1982) for which he received a CableAce Award nomination for best actor in a theatrical or non-musical production, The Cold Room (1984), and The Zany Adventures of Robin Hood (1984). He also starred in two short-lived television series, the semi-autobiographical sitcom Take Five (1987) and the crime drama Murphy's Law (1988–89). In 1985, he returned to Broadway in a short-lived production of Requiem for a Heavyweight by Rod Serling and in 1990 toured in a play called Double Act.

He later reflected on his career trajectory:
In the first 10 years, I was playing all different kinds of things. I loved the variety, and never had the sense of being a leading man but a character actor. Then I got frozen into this "urban" character. About the time of "The Last Married Couple in America" (1980) I remember Natalie (Wood) saying to me ... "It's one typed role after another, and pretty soon you forget everything. You forget why you're here, why you're doing it." Then my marriage started to fall apart ... I was disenchanted, I was turning in on myself, I was doing a lot of self-destructive things ... there were drugs ... I'm also sure I was guilty of spoiled behavior. I think it's impossible when that star rush comes not to get a little full of yourself, which is what I was.

Later career 
Nevertheless, after this relatively dry period, Segal re-established himself as a successful character actor in the 1990s. Though he appeared in some less-acclaimed films, he also worked with directors such as Mark Rydell, Gus Van Sant, Barbra Streisand, David O. Russell, Randal Kleiser, and Ben Stiller, respectively, in well-received films such as For the Boys (1991), To Die For (1995), The Mirror Has Two Faces (1996), Flirting with Disaster (1996), It's My Party (1996), and The Cable Guy (1996). Additionally, he had guest appearances on various shows such as Murder She Wrote and The Larry Sanders Show and continued to appear in television films such as Seasons of the Heart (1994), Houdini (1998), and The Linda McCartney Story (2000). In 1999, he briefly performed in Yasmina Reza's Art on Broadway, and in 2001 he reprised his performance in the West End.

From 1997 to 2003, Segal had his most prominent role in years when he starred in the NBC workplace sitcom Just Shoot Me! as Jack Gallo, the successful yet often oblivious owner and publisher of a New York City fashion magazine. For this role, he was nominated for the Golden Globe Award for Best Actor – Television Series Musical or Comedy in 1999 and 2000 as well as a Satellite Award in 2002. The show, which also starred David Spade and Laura San Giacomo, among others, and which once aired between iconic sitcoms Friends and Seinfeld, lasted for seven seasons and 148 episodes.

After finishing his run on Just Shoot Me, Segal appeared in supporting roles in films such as Heights (2005), 2012 (2009), and Love & Other Drugs (2010). Additionally, he worked more frequently as a voice actor, including a role in the English-language version of Studio Ghibli's The Tale of the Princess Kaguya (2013) and a comedic reprisal of his Who's Afraid of Virginia Woolf? role in a 2018 episode of The Simpsons. His most recent film performance was alongside Christopher Plummer in Elsa & Fred (2014). In other roles, Segal played talent manager Murray Berenson in three episodes of the television series Entourage (2009), guest starred in shows such as Boston Legal, Private Practice, and Pushing Daisies, appeared in comedic short videos such as Chutzpuh, This Is, and starred in the TV Land sitcom Retired at 35 (2011–2012), alongside his Bye Bye Braverman co-star Jessica Walter.

Segal had another success when he starred in the ABC  sitcom The Goldbergs (2013–2021), playing Albert "Pops" Solomon, the eccentric but lovable grandfather of a semi-autobiographical family based on that of series creator Adam F. Goldberg. The long-running series entered its eighth season in 2021, and Segal was part of the regular cast up until his death in March of that year. Throughout the show, Segal had appeared in most, though not all, episodes and, as in some of his earlier roles, he played the banjo several times on-screen.

In 2017, Segal received a star on the Hollywood Walk of Fame in the category of Television.

Personal life and death
Segal was married three times. He married film editor Marion Segal Freed in 1956, who would go on to work as an associate producer or editor on three of his films. They had two daughters and were together until their divorce in 1983. From 1983 until her death in 1996, he was married to Linda Rogoff, a one-time manager of The Pointer Sisters whom he met at Carnegie Hall when he played the banjo with his band the Beverly Hills Unlisted Jazz Band. He married his former George School boarding school classmate Sonia Schultz Greenbaum in 1998.

Later in his life, Segal lived part-time in Sonoma County when he was not filming The Goldbergs in Los Angeles.

Segal died of complications from bypass surgery in Santa Rosa, California, on March 23, 2021, at age 87.

Filmography

Film

Stage

Television

Discography

Awards and nominations

Other honors 
 1989: A portrait of Segal by photographer Lewis Morley was acquired by the National Portrait Gallery, London.
 2017: Star on the Hollywood Walk of Fame

Notes and references

External links 
 
 
 
 
 

1934 births
2021 deaths
20th-century American male actors
21st-century American male actors
Actors Studio alumni
American banjoists
American male film actors
American male stage actors
American male comedians
American male television actors
American male voice actors
American people of Russian-Jewish descent
United States Army soldiers
Best Musical or Comedy Actor Golden Globe (film) winners
Columbia College (New York) alumni
George School alumni
Haverford College alumni
Jewish American male actors
Male actors from New York (state)
Male actors from New York City
New Star of the Year (Actor) Golden Globe winners
People from Great Neck, New York
Philips Records artists
21st-century American Jews